Ridgeway Pitt, 3rd Earl of Londonderry (1722 – 1765) of Soldon in the parish of Holsworthy in North Devon, was a British politician and peer.

Origins
He was the younger son of Thomas Pitt, 1st Earl of Londonderry and was a first cousin of William Pitt, 1st Earl of Chatham ("Pitt the Elder"), twice prime minister of Great Britain.

Career
His older brother, Thomas Pitt, 2nd Earl of Londonderry (1717-1734), died in a riding accident in 1734, when Ridgeway succeeded to his titles. In 1740 he was admitted to St John's College, Cambridge. He took his seat in the Irish House of Lords on 29 October 1743. As his title was in the Peerage of Ireland, he was not barred from election to the House of Commons of Great Britain and sat as a Member of Parliament for the rotten borough of Camelford in Cornwall between 1747 and 1754.

Death
Londonderry never married. Upon his death, his titles became extinct.

References

1722 births
1765 deaths
Members of the Parliament of Great Britain for constituencies in Cornwall
British MPs 1747–1754
Alumni of St John's College, Cambridge
Ridgeway
Ridgeway